The following list shows the recipients for the Country Music Association Award for Female Vocalist of the Year. This Award goes to the artist. The Award is based on individual musical performance on a solo Country single or album release, as well as the overall contribution to Country Music. This award was one of the original awards given at the first ceremony in 1967. The first recipient was Loretta Lynn and the most recent recipient is Lainey Wilson.

Recipients

Category facts
Most wins

Most nominations

Win on first nomination

In CMA history only nine women have won Female Vocalist of the Year the very first time they were nominated. They are:

 Loretta Lynn (1967)
 Olivia Newton-John (1974)
 K.T. Oslin (1988)
 Mary Chapin Carpenter (1992)
 Alison Krauss (1995)
 Gretchen Wilson (2005)
 Carrie Underwood (2006)
 Carly Pearce (2021)
 Lainey Wilson (2022)

References

See also
Country Music Association Awards

Country Music Association Awards
Lists of women